The Brunei dollar (sign: B$, Malay: ringgit Brunei, currency code: BND), has been the currency of the Sultanate of Brunei since 1967. It is normally abbreviated with the dollar sign $, or alternatively B$ to distinguish it from other dollar-denominated currencies. It is divided into 100 sen (Malay) or cents (English). The Brunei dollar is issued by the Autoriti Monetari Brunei Darussalam (Monetary Authority of Brunei Darussalam).

Under a Currency Interchangeability Agreement in 1967, the Brunei dollar is interchangeable with the Singapore dollar at par. As such, the Brunei dollar is accepted in Singapore as "customary tender"; likewise, the Singapore dollar is accepted  in Brunei.

History

Early currency in Brunei included cowrie shells. Brunei is also famous for its bronze teapots, which were used as currency in barter trade along the coast of northern Borneo. The Spanish-American silver dollar brought over by the Manila galleons was in wide use for Brunei's international trade from the 16th to 19th centuries; the 19th century Straits dollar was itself derived from the same coin.

Brunei issued tin coins denominated in pitis in AH1285 (AD1868). These were followed by a one cent coin in AH1304 (AD1888). This cent was one hundredth of a Straits dollar.

As a protectorate of Britain in the early 20th century, Brunei used the Straits dollar from 1906, the Malayan dollar from 1939 and the Malaya and British Borneo dollar from 1953 until 1967, when it began issuing its own currency.

The Brunei dollar replaced the Malaya and British Borneo dollar in 1967 after the formation of Malaysia and the independence of Singapore. Until 23 June 1973, the Malaysian ringgit was exchangeable at par with the Singapore dollar and Brunei dollar. The Monetary Authority of Singapore and the Brunei Currency and Monetary Board (now the Authoriti Monetari Brunei Darussalam (Monetary Authority of Brunei Darussalam) still maintain the exchangeability of their two currencies. The dollar is accepted as "customary tender" in Singapore according to the Currency Interchangeability Agreement, although it is not legal tender there.

History of coins used in Brunei
Coins were used in Brunei from the 10th century. The Straits dollar was also used in Brunei from 1906.

Due to the close ties between China and Brunei, the first type of coins used in Brunei were Chinese coins. This was initially called ‘Pitis’. They were later known as ‘Kue’ when local ‘Pitis’ were introduced. The local ‘Pitis’ coins had ‘Sultanate of Brunei’ stamped in front of the coin and the royal umbrella was imprinted at the back. These were issued from the 16th to the 19th century. Previous Islamic coins were also called the ‘Pitis’. Another type of coin that was used in Brunei were ‘Duit besi’ (which roughly translates to ‘Iron money’). Iron was considered valuable those days that it was used as money. 100 one-square inch pieces were valued at 1 dollar.

The last coin to be issued before the introduction of the Straits Settlements currency was the ‘Duit Bintang’, otherwise known as the ‘Star coin’ or the 'Star Cent'. It is called the Star coin because of the star imprinted on the obverse of the coin. It was minted in Birmingham, England, in 1887. It was made from copper.

With the introduction of the Straits Settlements currency, the previously used coins were taken out of circulation. They were, however still used with certain exchange rates.

History of banknotes used in Brunei

The Straits dollar was introduced in Brunei in 1906. It was later replaced by the Malayan dollar which was introduced to British colonies and Brunei in 1939. It replaced the Straits dollar at par with a 1:1 exchange rate. The Malayan dollar was issued by the Board of Commissioners of Currency in Malaya. The board stopped issuing the Malayan dollar during the Japanese invasion during World War II. The Malayan dollar had the portrait of King George VI in front of the note.

In 1952, the board was renamed the Board of Commissioners of Malaya and British Borneo. The board then began to issue notes to Malaya, Singapore, Sarawak, British North Borneo, and Brunei in 1953. This was known as the Malaya and British Borneo dollar. 
In 1967, the Malaya and British Borneo dollar was replaced by three new currencies: the Malaysian dollar, Singapore dollar and the Brunei dollar, all at par.

The Singapore dollar is still interchangeable with the Brunei dollar today.

Coins

In 1967, coins were introduced in denominations of 1, 5, 10, 20 and 50 cents. Except for the bronze 1 cent, the coins were struck in cupro-nickel. In 1986, copper-clad steel replaced bronze. Later, in 2008, the 1 cent coins switched compositions to brass.

Banknotes

On 12 June 1967, the government (Kerajaan Brunei) introduced notes in denominations of 1, 5, 10, 50 and 100 dollars. Notes for 500 and 1000 dollars followed in 1979. In 1989, the title on the paper money was changed to Negara Brunei Darussalam, the official name of the country, and the Malay term for “State of Brunei, Abode of Peace.” 10,000 dollar notes were introduced the same year. All notes bear the denomination in Malay (in both Rumi and Jawi) and in English. The English denomination appeared on the obverse below the denomination in Malay on the earlier series, but now appears on the reverse together with the Jawi.

Five series of notes have been issued. The colours of $1, $5, and $10 notes have been the same for all the series of banknotes.

1967 series

First series (1967) – currency with the portrait of Sultan Omar Ali Saifuddin III, the 28th ruler of Brunei.
 $1 – blue
 $5 – green
 $10 – red
 $50 – brown
 $100 – purple

1972 series

Second series – This series was the same as the first series with exception that the portrait of Sultan Omar Ali Saifuddin was replaced by the portrait of Sultan Hassanal Bolkiah, the 29th and current ruler of Brunei.  All subsequent currency has the portrait of Hassanal Bolkiah. In addition, two new higher denominations were issued in 1979.
 $1 ~ $100 like 1967 series
 $500 – pink
 $1000 – yellow

1989 series

Third series – the post independence series. This series was gradually being replaced by the fourth series.
 $1 – blue
 $5 – green
 $10 – red
 $50 – brown, green, orange
 $100 – purple
 $500 – orange
 $1,000 – red-violet, purple, olive
 $10,000 – green, orange

1996–2000 polymer and paper series

Fourth Series (1996–2000) all notes except for the polymer issues are no longer printed.

2004–2007 (polymer) series 

Polymer banknotes were introduced in (2004) due to high cases of banknote forgery. All of them are polymer. The $100 note of this series has won a gold medal award for its security features in the 22nd National Print Award in Australia in May 2005.

The S$10,000 and B$10,000 notes are the world's most valuable banknotes, worth US$8000 as of September 2014 (that are officially in circulation). They are worth eight times as much as the next most valuable, the 1000 Swiss franc note (US$1063). From 6 November 2020, AMBD has announced it will stop printing B$10,000 notes to reduce the risk of money laundering. Brunei has also stopped the issuance of B$10,000 and is in the process of withdrawing it from active circulation.

2011 polymer series

 $1 – blue (2011)
 $5 – green and yellow (2011)
 $10 – red, yellow and brown (2011)
 To commemorate the 65th birthday of Sultan Hassanal Bolkiah. Shortly after the notes were issued, the Braille dots on the upper left front corner of the new polymer notes are not raised. The Braille dots cannot be felt tactilely, and they are not accurately rendered as Braille numbers corresponding to the denominations. Specifically, the spacing of the dots is wrong, and they lack the lead-in character that indicates that numbers follow.

Commemorative banknotes

 $25 – purple and beige (1992)
This was issued during the silver jubilee (25th anniversary) of Sultan Hassanal Bolkiah acceding to the throne. The design is of the 1989 series of currency.

 $20 – yellow (polymer, 2007)
On 27 June 2007, Singapore and Brunei celebrated the 40th anniversary of the Currency Interchangeability Agreement (since 12 June 1967) by joint-issuing commemorative $20 notes.

The two authorities issue distinct versions of the new $20 notes. They are both yellow, 149 × 72 mm in size, and made of polymer. The reverses are almost identical except that the Brunei version has their state title in Jawi script, while the Singaporean version has the state title of Brunei in Latin script. The obverse of the Singaporean version is similar to the current Portrait Series, whereas the obverse of the Brunei version is similar to the $50 and $100 of the 2004 series.

There is a limited edition set, which consists of both versions in a folder, with matching serial number. The notes have "40th Anniversary Currency Interchangeability Agreement" overprinted on obverse. In addition, the Singaporean version has the two countries' state crests above the commemorative text. Only 12,000 sets are available, 10,000 from the Monetary Authority of Singapore, and 2,000 from the Brunei Currency and Monetary Board.

The circulation version has been available since 16 July 2007.

 $50 - yellow (polymer, 2017)
 In 2017, both Brunei and Singapore issued $50 polymer banknotes in commemoration of the 50th Anniversary of its Currency Interchangeability Agreement.

 $50 - yellow (polymer, 2017)
 In 2017, the Autoriti Monetari Brunei Darussalam issued a $50 polymer banknote, alongside a 50 cent coin, to commemorate the 50th anniversary of Sultan Hassan al-Bolkiah's accession to the throne. On the front it depicts the monarch's coronation alongside a portrait of Sultan Hassanal Bolkiah. One notable security feature of the note is the use of an optically variable ink called "spark live"

See also
 Economy of Brunei
 Brunei pitis

References

External links

 
Autoriti Monetari Brunei Darussalam (Monetary Authority of Brunei Darussalam)

Dollar
Currencies of Asia
Circulating currencies
Currencies of the Commonwealth of Nations
Economy of Brunei
Currencies of Brunei
Currencies introduced in 1967
Fixed exchange rate
1967 establishments in Asia